Joe Yamauchi (born c. 1933) is a retired Canadian football player who played for the Edmonton Eskimos, Calgary Stampeders and BC Lions. He previously football at Eastern Washington University.

References

1930s births
Living people
Players of Canadian football from Alberta
Canadian football running backs
Canadian players of American football
Eastern Washington Eagles football players
Edmonton Elks players
Calgary Stampeders players
BC Lions players
People from Thorhild County